Parepisparis lutosaria, the bright twisted moth, is a species of moth of the family Geometridae first described by Rudolf Felder and Alois Friedrich Rogenhofer in 1875. It is known from the Australian states of Queensland, New South Wales and Victoria.

The wingspan is about 50 mm. Adults have pale brown wings with variable markings, but usually with three dark marks along each forewing costa. The margin of each forewing is recurved to give a pointed apex.

The larvae probably feed on the foliage Eucalyptus species. They have a pair of long horns on the thorax, each with a forked tip.

References

Oenochrominae
Taxa named by Alois Friedrich Rogenhofer
Moths described in 1875